Chinatrust Financial Building, or Chinatrust Group Tower, was a 22-storey,  office building completed in 1996 and located in Xinyi Special District, Taipei, Taiwan. The building served as the corporate headquarters of the Taiwanese bank CTBC Financial Holding, before it was demolished in 2016 to make way for Taipei Sky Tower. CTBC Financial Holding's new corporate headquarters was then subsequently relocated to CTBC Financial Park in Nangang District.

See also 
 List of tallest buildings in Taiwan
 List of tallest buildings in Taipei
 CTBC Financial Park
 CTBC Financial Holding
 Taipei Sky Tower

References

1996 establishments in Taiwan
Former skyscrapers
Office buildings in Taipei
Office buildings completed in 1996
Buildings and structures demolished in 2016
Demolished buildings and structures in Taiwan